Anthony Waller (born 24 October 1959) is a film director. He was born in Beirut.

Filmography
Mute Witness (1995)
An American Werewolf in Paris (1997)
The Guilty (2000)
Nine Miles Down (2008)
The Singularity Is Near (2009)
 Trader (TV Series) (2020)

External links
 About Anthony Waller
 

British film directors
Living people
1959 births
People educated at Sidcot School